Crossota is a genus of hydrozoans of the family Rhopalonematidae. The genus comprises five species. Unlike most hydromedusae, these do not have a sessile stage. Rather, they spend their entire lives in the water column as plankton. The genus Crossota is widespread throughout the oceans.

Species 
Crossota alba
Crossota brunnea
Crossota millsae
Crossota norvegica
Crossota rufobrunnea

References 

World Register of Marine Species.

Rhopalonematidae
Hydrozoan genera
Bioluminescent cnidarians